Quepem is a sub-division of South Goa district in the state of Goa, India. It is an administrative region of Goa, India.

Settlements

Cities
Quepem has 2 cities: Curchorem-Cacora, Quepem

Towns
Quepem has 1 town: Xeldem

Villages
Quepem has 35 villages: Adnem, Ambaulim, Assolda, Avedem, Bali, Barcem, Bendordem, Cavorem, Cazur, Chaifi, Cordem, Corla, Cotombi, Fatorpa, Gocoldem, Maina, Mangal, Molcarnem, Molcopona, Morpila, Nagvem, Naquerim, Odar, Padi, Pirla, Quedem, Quisconda, Quitol, Sirvoi, Sulcorna, Tiloi, Undorna, Xelvona, Xic-Xelvona, Zanodem

See also
Goa
Konkani people
History of Goa
Salcette
Bardez

References

External links
Cities and villages in Quepem Taluk

Taluks of Goa
Geography of South Goa district